Tyrone A. Garner (born 1969) is an American politician and retired police officer who is currently serving as the 30th mayor of Kansas City, Kansas since 2021. He previously served as the deputy chief of the Kansas City Police Department (KCKPD).

Tyrone Garner was born in Portland, Maine. He grew up in San Jose, California before he and his family moved to Kansas City, Kansas (KCK) at the beginning of his freshman year in high school. He graduated from Wyandotte High School in 1987 and enlisted in the United States Army. After being honorably discharged, Garner joined the KCKPD where he would serve for over three decades, attaining the ranks of captain, major, and ultimately deputy chief. Mr. Garner was the first and only African American KCK police officer to attend and graduate from the prestigious FBI National Academy in Quantico, Virginia and was the first African American male commander to ever command the western portion of KCKS.
He retired in 2019, and briefly served on the Kansas City Kansas Community College Board of Trustees. Garner served as a governor-appointed Kansas African American Affairs Commissioner for the Kansas Congressional 3rd District. He also appointed the first African-American female chief of staff and county administrator in Wyandotte County.

On November 2, 2021, Garner defeated incumbent David Alvey in a close election to become the first African-American mayor/CEO of the United Government of Wyandotte County and Kansas City, Kansas. He took office on December 13, 2021.

Mayor/CEO of Unified Government (2021-present) 

On January 10, 2022, Garner hired Wyandotte County's first black female interim county administrator, Cheryl Harrison-Lee.  Only four months later, on April 21, 2022, Unified Government Commissioners raised questions about Harrison-Lee's dedication to the job, citing her ongoing consultancy work with the neighboring city of Kansas City, Missouri, administering economic development tax revenues. Garner "angrily stormed out of a special session" of the Unified Government on May 3, 2022, refusing to answer commissioners' requests that he begin a nationwide search for a permanent county administrator.  Commissioners cited the interim administrators' possible conflict of interest as reasons to begin the search.

Controversies 

On December 16, 2021, Garner proposed ending the county's mask mandate early amid rising COVID-19 cases and against the appeal of county health officials. The repeal of the mask mandate was one of Garner's first acts in office.

On December 27, 2021, Garner closed the county's sole cold-weather shelter.  After citizen protests and an emergency commissioners meeting, the cold shelter was eventually allowed to open.

On January 18, 2022, KCTV News broke the story that Garner charged county taxpayers $85,569 for a new Yukon Denali.  After widespread community debate, Garner returned the luxury SUV on February 8, 2022.

"... weeks into his tenure" in January 2022, Garner blocked a $23 million downtown redevelopment project, despite campaigning on a promise to revitalize the downtown core.  The project was to include 70 to 85 apartment units, as well as a fitness center and meeting space. The proposed development is supported by the Commission.

Honors and awards 

 2016 KCKPS Reasons to Believe Award Recipient 
 2018 Black Achievers Award presented by the SCLC of Greater Kansas City
 KC Globe Most Influential Kansas Citians of 2015 Award
 Eugene K. Patterson Community Service Award presented by the Heart of America Chapter of The Tuskegee Airmen
 Rosalyn Brown and Betty Taliaferro Service Award presented by Friends of Yates, Inc.

See also 
 List of first African-American mayors

References 

1960s births
20th-century African-American people
21st-century African-American politicians
21st-century American politicians
African-American people in Kansas politics
Date of birth missing (living people)
FBI National Academy graduates
Kansas Democrats
Living people
Mayors of places in Kansas
Politicians from Kansas City, Kansas
Politicians from San Jose, California
African-American mayors in Kansas